Roa or Røa may refer to:

Places
Roa, Ivory Coast, a village in Comoé District, Ivory Coast
Roa, Norway, administrative centre of Lunner municipality
Roa de Duero, a municipality in Burgos Province, Spain
Røa, a former borough of the city of Oslo, Norway

People
Carlos Roa, an Argentine football goalkeeper
Laura Roa, Spanish bioengineer
ROA (artist) or Roa, pseudonym of a Belgian graffiti artist

Fictional characters
Michael Roa Valdamjong, a character in the visual novel Tsukihime
Loa (Fullmetal Alchemist) or Roa, a character in the manga series Fullmetal Alchemist

Other uses
Roa (fish), a genus of butterflyfish
ST Roa, a tugboat
Roa Branch or Roa Incline, New Zealand branch railway section of Blackball Branch
Kiwi (bird), flightless birds endemic to New Zealand
Racehorse Owners Association, a UK-based membership association

See also
ROA (disambiguation)
Röa (disambiguation)